

Freddie Query (born February 4, 1952) is a former late model dirt track racing driver from Mooresville, North Carolina. He raced in the southeastern United States, primarily in North Carolina during the 80s and 90s. He raced in the NASCAR AutoZone Elite Division, Southeast Series. Query won the 1998 Slim Jim All Pro Series championship. He attempted to make one NASCAR Craftsman Truck Series race that year but did not qualify. Query had the most Super Late Model wins at Concord Motorsport Park. He became the general manager for Hank Parker Racing in 2000; the team closed operations 3 years later.

Query now owns a Track Operation Industry in Mooresville.

Motorsports career results

NASCAR
(key) (Bold – Pole position awarded by qualifying time. Italics – Pole position earned by points standings or practice time. * – Most laps led.)

Winston Cup Series

Busch Series

Craftsman Truck Series

References

External links
 

Living people
1952 births
People from Mooresville, North Carolina
Racing drivers from North Carolina
NASCAR drivers